Dendrelaphis wickrorum, commonly known as Wickramasinghes' bronze-back, is a species of arboreal snake endemic to Sri Lanka.

Etymology
The specific name wickrorum is in honor of prominent herpetologist L. J. Mendis Wickramasinghe and his wife Nethu Wickramasinghe for their remarkable contributions to the field of herpetology in Sri Lanka. It was formerly considered to be Dendrelaphis bifrenalis.

Taxonomy
The species is sympatric with other bronzeback species: D. sinharajensis, D. schokari and D. caudolineolatus in the wet zone. It was formerly confused with Dendrelaphis bifrenalis, but the dry-zone populations of Dendrelaphis bifrenalis are the real ones, and the wet-zone populations are Dendrelaphis wickrorum.

Description
Eyes are slightly larger than more common bronzeback species, Dendrelaphis bifrenalis. A temporal stripe stopping just beyond the neck and a ventrolateral stripe continuing up to the tail. It has a divided nasal. Dorsally olive green and ventrally brownish yellow snake. There is a yellow colour longitudinal ventro-lateral line starts from anterior body continues until tail. Head dark olive green dorsally. A black stripe runs from posterior nasal across eye until the neck.

Distribution
The snake is found from forest areas of Pundaluoya, Kuda-Waskaduwa, Pinwatta-Panadura and Labugama.

Ecology
Diurnal and predominantly arboreal that hunts in sub-canopy and the understory.

References

wickrorum
Snakes of Asia
Reptiles of Sri Lanka
Endemic fauna of Sri Lanka
Reptiles described in 2020